Toe wrestling is a sport involving two opponents who lock toes and attempt to pin each other's feet down, similar to arm wrestling.

History
The sport was invented in 1976 in Staffordshire, United Kingdom by 4 drinkers in the Ye Olde Royal Oak Inn.

The World Toe Wrestling Championship was held annually since 1994 at The Royal Oak in Wetton.  In 2022, the Championship relocated to the Ex Servicemen's Club in Wetton. The most prolific player is Alan "Nasty" Nash, a multiple-time champion. Lisa "Twinkletoes" Shenton is a previous women’s world champion.

As of 2022, the current men's world champion is Ben Woodroffe; the women's champion is Dawn Millward beating newcomer Rebecca Benson who came 2nd; and the junior champion is Dolly Millward.

Rules 
Toe wrestling is similar to arm wrestling. To play, players must take off their shoes and socks as the game is played with bare feet. Players must link toes and each player's foot must touch flat on the other person's 2 out of 3 rounds. Rounds are played first with the right foot, then left, and right again if necessary.

See also
Thumb twiddling
Thumb wrestling

References

Children's games
Games of physical skill
ja:足相撲